PFLP may refer to:

Popular Front for the Liberation of Palestine (PFLP)
Popular Front for the Liberation of Palestine – General Command (PFLP-GC) based in Syria. Founded in 1968 by Ahmed Jibril after splitting from PFLP
Popular Front for the Liberation of Palestine – External Operations (PFLP-EO) founded by Palestinian radical Wadie Haddad when engaging in international attacks, that were regarded as terrorism, and were not sanctioned by PFLP
Popular Front for the Liberation of Palestine – Special Command (PFLP-SC), minor breakout faction from Wadie Haddad's ultraradical PFLP-EO
Private Fund Limited Partnership